The 1968–69 Georgetown Hoyas men's basketball team represented Georgetown University during the 1968–69 NCAA University Division college basketball season. John Magee coached them in his third season as head coach. The team was an independent and played its home games at McDonough Gymnasium on the Georgetown campus in Washington, D.C. It finished the season with a record of 12-12 and had no post-season play.

Season recap

Diminutive guard Don Weber joined the team this season after an impressive stint with the freshman team the previous year. He played a fast-break style of offense and scored in double figures four times, including a season-high 22 points against William & Mary.

Against Loyola in the first game of the season, junior center Charlie Adrion had 24 points and 19 rebounds. In the next game, he scored a career-high 40 points against American. Over the next three games after that – against Randolph–Macon, George Washington, and St. John's – he had a combined 91 points and 44 rebounds. Adrion led the team in scoring in nine of the seasons first 10 games, each time scoring in double figures.

On February 13, 1969, Adrion scored only seven points against New York University, and against Rutgers two days later he suffered a season-ending knee injury. With Adrion out, senior forward and team captain Jim Supple, who scored in double figures in 18 of the 23 games he appeared in during the season, stepped up his scoring production: He averaged 20 points per game after Adrions injury, led the team in scoring in six of the last seven games of the year, and finished the season averaging 16.5 points per game.

Despite Supples efforts, the 1968-69 team continued a recent pattern of strong Georgetown starts followed by late-season collapses – the 1964-65 team lost seven of its final 10 games, while in 1966-67 the Hoyas lost eight of their final 11 games – that sank hopes for a berth in a post-season tournament. After going 10-5 in its first 15 games, it lost seven of its last nine to finish with a record of 12-12. During the three seasons from 1966-67 though this season, Georgetown had a combined record of 6-18 in the last eight games of the season, 1-13 on the road.

The 1968-69 team was not ranked in the Top 20 in the Associated Press Poll or Coaches' Poll at any time.

Roster
Source

1968–69 schedule and results

Sources

|-
!colspan=9 style="background:#002147; color:#8D817B;"| Regular Season

References

Georgetown Hoyas men's basketball seasons
Georgetown
Georgetown Hoyas men's basketball team
Georgetown Hoyas men's basketball team